Bull Canyon Spring may refer to:

Arizona
Bull Canyon Spring (Gila County, Arizona)	
Bull Canyon Spring (Maricopa County, Arizona)

California
Bull Canyon Spring (Riverside County, California)